is an autobahn in Germany which connects the Bundesautobahn 30 in the north and the A 44 in the south.

History 
The history of the A 33 began in the 1960s as the B 68. It was intended that the route would be extended northwards to reach Bramsche, and to this day, the B 68 has been partially extended between Osnabrück and Bramsche in a similar fashion to an Autobahn.

One major gap currently exist in the A 33. Plans to close the 9 km long gap between the A 33 and the A 1 around Osnabrück are underway, the selected route having been submitted by the planning authority of Lower Saxony to the Federal Ministry of Transport, Building and Urban Development (BMVBS) for approval. Also a larger (about 8 km) gap existed between the exit for Borgholzhausen and Bielefeld. This gap has been closed as the last section between Borgholzhausen and Halle (Westf.) has been completed in November 2019.

Route 
The A 33 begins to the east of Osnabrück in Belm, crossing over the A 30 to Osnabrück Süd, running through Georgsmarienhütte, Hilter am Teutoburger Wald, Bad Rothenfelde and Dissen am Teutoburger Wald, Borgholzhausen, Halle (Westf.), running through Bielefeld, Sennestadt, Schloß Holte-Stukenbrock, Paderborn and Borchen before terminating at the Bad Wünnenberg interchange, which joins the A 44 running between Dortmund and Kassel as well as the B 480, which leads on through Brilon in the Sauerland region.

Route names 
The three different stretches of road are named according to the region in which they are located. The Osnabrück-Bielefeld route is known as the Teutoburger-Wald-Autobahn, the route between Bielefeld and Paderborn, which feeds into the A 2, is known as the Senneautobahn, and the remainder leading through East Westphalia is known as the Ostwestfalenmagistrale.

Notable features 
Between junctions Dissen and Dissen Süd, a tunnel has been built of around 700 m length to protect the surrounding area, especially the health resort Bad Rothenfelde from the noise.

Exit list 

 

 

|}

External links 

33
A033
A033